Adokiye Amiesimaka Stadium is a multi-use stadium in Port Harcourt, Nigeria, on the north end of the city in the Omagwa neighbourhood.
The stadium is named after Adokiye Amiesimaka, a former player with Nigeria's National football team who was among the squad that won the African Nations Cup in 1980, former Chairman of Sharks Football club and a former Attorney General of Rivers State. Presently, the stadium has a capacity of 38,000 people.

It opened on 19 July 2015 with a match between Nigeria and Congo in a qualifier for the Rio Olympics which ended with a 2–1 scoreline success over Congo.

Later that month, Nigerian Premier League squad Dolphins announced  they will play the remainder of the 2015 season in the stadium.

From January 25 to 27 2019, the stadium was used for a 3-day event tagged, Higher Life Conference with Pastor Chris Oyakhilome. It was filled to full capacity and thousands of people sat on the main pitch for this event. It serves as the home ground to Rivers United.

Renovation 
The main pitch of the stadium developed undulations that made it impracticable for standard football games to be hosted there. In 2020, a contract was signed for renovation of the main turf, training fields and a total facelift for facilities in the stadium. A decision was also made in 2020 by the Nigerian Federal Government to concession the stadium by 2021 to enable it have better facilities and yield more revenue.

Matches 
The stadium has played host to many matches of the Nigerian Professional Football League including the game between Rivers United Football Club and Adamawa United in the 2020/2021 football season, and CAF Champion league between Rivers United and Young African from Tanzania.

External links

References
Linda Ikeji Blog Magazine - Rio Olympics 2016

Football venues in Nigeria
Sports venues in Port Harcourt
Sports venues completed in 2015
2015 establishments in Nigeria
2010s establishments in Rivers State
21st-century architecture in Nigeria